Parkan  may refer to:
 Parkan (series), video game series starting 1997
 Parkan, Iran (disambiguation), places in Iran
 Štúrovo, town in Slovakia